DJ D.O.C. is a South Korean hip-hop trio consisting of members Kim Chang-yeol, Lee Ha-neul and Jung Jae-yong. DJ D.O.C. stands for Dream Of Children. DJ DOC released their first album, Sorrow of Superman, in 1994. During a time when Korean hip hop was still largely underground, they went on to experience great commercial success and many of their singles, including "Dance with DOC" (1997) and "Run to You" (2000) are now considered well-known iconic K-pop songs.

Initially an underground group, DJ DOC became known to mainstream audiences for the satirical content of their lyrics, which often criticized societal injustices and overtly used profanity. It garnered them both popularity and criticism during the mid to late 1990s; their songs became well known to a younger generation already disgruntled with the government's strict censorship rules regarding free speech but was also censored by radio and television stations for the provocative lyrics.

History
The original band debuted with Park Jung-hwan, but he left the group after the release of the first album due to disagreement between the members. After his departure, he started his own car dealership.

On November 11, 2011, Park Jung-hwan formally filed a lawsuit against DJ DOC for defamation after comments made by Lee Ha-neul regarding his departure on a television appearance aired November 3, 2011 on Happy Together Season 3.

Despite several apologies made by Lee Ha-neul, the lawsuit was not rescinded. On February 22, 2012, DJ Doc was cleared of the defamation charges for lack of evidence.

During periods of hiatus, Lee and Kim have been engaged in solo activities. Kim hosts the popular radio show Old School (ko) on SBS Love FM. On August 9, 2013, Lee became a judge for season 5 of South Korean television talent show Superstar K. In 2015 they made a guest appearance in the music video of "Tell Me One More Time", the comeback single of their counterparts Jinusean.

DJ DOC was one of fifteen artists or groups, including the likes of Insooni, 2PM and Kim Tae-woo, headlining the medal ceremony aftershow for each day of the 2018 Winter Olympics.

Members
 Lee Ha-neul (이하늘)
 Jung Jae-yong (정재용)
 Kim Chang-yeol (김창열)
Past members
 Park Jung-hwan (박정환)

Discography

Studio albums

Compilation albums
 Best of Best Panda Mix (1998)
 Season's Greeting (2000)
 The Best (2000)

Extended plays
 대한민국 만세 (1996)
 Summer (1996)

Awards and nominations

Mnet Asian Music Awards

Other awards

References

South Korean hip hop groups
South Korean pop music groups
South Korean dance music groups
MAMA Award winners
Melon Music Award winners
South Korean boy bands